The Fundación Española para la Ciencia y la Tecnología (FECYT) (English: Spanish Foundation for Science and Technology) is a Spanish public nonprofit organization dependent on the Ministry of Science that promotes Spanish science and technology. It was formed in 2001 and among other activities, it manages the National Museum of Science and Technology.

References

This article incorporates information from the Spanish Wikipedia.

External links
 Official site

Scientific organisations based in Spain
2001 establishments in Spain